Gabriel Alejandro Vilches Sandoval (born 1 May 1985) is a Chilean former footballer. His last club was Coquimbo Unido.

He previously played for Trasandino in three differents steps (2005–2008), Unión Española (2008), Unión San Felipe (2009), Unión La Calera (2009–2010), San Luis de Quillota (2011–2012) and Iberia (2012).

References

External links
 
 
 
 Gabriel Vilches at playmakerstats.com (English version of ceroacero.es)

1985 births
Living people
Footballers from Santiago
Chilean footballers
Chilean Primera División players
Unión Española footballers
Tercera División de Chile players
Trasandino footballers
Primera B de Chile players
Unión San Felipe footballers
Unión La Calera footballers
San Luis de Quillota footballers
Coquimbo Unido footballers
Segunda División Profesional de Chile players
Deportes Iberia footballers
Association football midfielders
People from Santiago Province, Chile